Richard Bélanger was a city councillor from Montreal, Quebec, Canada. He served as the borough mayor of L'Île-Bizard–Sainte-Geneviève from 2005 to 2013.

Bélanger was a member of the Union Montreal municipal political party until November 23, 2012, when he resigned from UM, along with the entire borough council.

Bélanger is a native of Île Bizard, and was a city councillor since 1991.

References

External links
Richard Bélanger (Union Montreal)
L'Île-Bizard–Sainte-Geneviève (Ville de Montréal) - Vos élus

Montreal city councillors
Living people
Mayors of places in Quebec
People from L'Île-Bizard–Sainte-Geneviève
Year of birth missing (living people)